Duncan Tanner (19 February 1958 – 11 February 2010) was a political historian and academic. His best-known work covered the British Labour Party and voting in the early 20th century. He held the post of director of the Welsh Institute for Social and Cultural Affairs at Bangor University.

Selected bibliography
Political Change and the Labour Party 1900-1918 (1990)
Labour's First Century (2000)
Debating nationhood and governance in Britain, 1885-1945 (2006)
The Strange Survival of Liberal England (2007)

References

1958 births
2010 deaths
British historians
Academics of Bangor University
People from Caldicot, Monmouthshire